Will Graham is an American producer, director, and screenwriter. He is the showrunner of Mozart in the Jungle and was one of the founders of the Onion News Network. He is also the co-creator of the 2022 television series A League of Their Own.

Biography 
Graham graduated from Columbia University, where he was director of the 107th Varsity Show. Among his castmates were Lang Fisher, who created Never Have I Ever with Mindy Kaling, and DGA Award-winning director Susanna Fogel, executive producer of The Flight Attendant.

He was one of the founders of the Onion News Network and showrunner of the spin-off Onion SportsDome for Comedy Central. Graham has long been associated with Amazon Studios, where he produced one of the studio's first pilots, The Onion Presents: The News, the pilot Salem Rogers and wrote for Alpha House. He became an executive producer of the series Mozart in the Jungle at the beginning of its third season. He was also the director the short film Homeschooled, starring Liev Schreiber and Naomi Watts, and was released as part of the film Movie 43.

In 2017, Graham formed Field Trip Productions and signed a first-look deal with Amazon Studios.

In November 2019, he signed a new first-look deal with Amazon Studios as a showrunner of Daisy Jones & The Six and A League of Their Own.

He won a Peabody Award in 2009 for directing and executive producing Onion News Network. He was also nominated for a Webby Awards in 2011 as part of The Onion team.

Filmography

References 

Living people
Columbia College (New York) alumni
American directors
American television producers
American television writers
Peabody Award winners
Year of birth missing (living people)